Chaetoria is a genus of bristle flies in the family Tachinidae. There are about five described species in Chaetoria.

Species
These five species belong to the genus Chaetoria:
 Chaetoria aurifrons (Bezzi & Lamb, 1926) c g
 Chaetoria micronyx Mesnil, 1971 c g
 Chaetoria setibasis (Malloch, 1930) c g
 Chaetoria spinicosta (Thomson, 1869) c g
 Chaetoria stylata Becker, 1908 c g
Data sources: i = ITIS, c = Catalogue of Life, g = GBIF, b = Bugguide.net

References

Further reading

External links

 
 

Tachinidae